Shoot to Kill, also known as Police Reporter, is a 1947 American film noir directed by William Berke and starring Robert Kent, Luana Walters, Edmund MacDonald and Russell Wade.

Plot
Pursued by police cars, a fleeing motor vehicle crashes off the side of the road. The survivor relates the events that preceded the chase in flashback format. A former gangster is framed by a corrupt district attorney. With his wife and an investigative reporter, he gathers proof of his innocence in hopes of clearing his name.

Cast

 Russell Wade as investigative reporter George "Mitch" Mitchell
 Luana Walters (billed as Susan Walters) as Marian Langdon - Logan's wife
 Edmund MacDonald as the corrupt Asst. DA, Lawrence Dale
 Robert Kent (billed as Douglas Blackley) as former gangster "Dixie" Logan aka Judge Joel Conroy
 Vince Barnett as Charlie Gill - Janitor
 Nestor Paiva as Gus Miller - Gangster
 Charles Trowbridge as District Attorney John Forsythe
 Harry Brown as Jim Forman - Paid witness
 Ted Hecht as Al Collins - Paid witness
 Harry Cheshire as Mike Blake - Gangster
 Robert Riordan as Ed Carter
 Joe Devlin as Smokey, Man Tailing Dale
 Eddie Foster as Bingo, Man Tailing Dale
 Frank O'Connor as Deputy Clem Sparks
 Sammy Stein as Blackie
 Gene Rodgers as Piano Player

Reception

The New York Times panned the film, writing: "Screeching tires and the barking of guns are the chief sound effects in Shoot to Kill, an all-around amateurish job of movie-making which found its way into the Rialto yesterday. An outfit called Screen Guild Productions is responsible for this dilly about an assistant district attorney who double-crosses all his racketeer pals and winds up his career on a slab in the morgue. William Berke as the director-producer did not get anything resembling a performance, much less characterization, out of his players, chief of whom are Russell Wade, Susan Walters, Edmund MacDonald and Douglas Blackley."

Soundtrack
Gene Rodgers appears on screen performing two of his own compositions: "Ballad of the Bayou" and "Rajah's Blues." The film's score was provided by Darrell Calker.

References

External links
 
 
 
 
 

1947 films
1947 crime drama films
American black-and-white films
American crime drama films
American crime thriller films
1940s English-language films
Film noir
Films directed by William A. Berke
Lippert Pictures films
1940s American films